St. Soldier Educational Society is an Indian group of schools and colleges that was established in 1958.

The Society has more than 30,000 students in India from Pre-Nursery to Post Graduation. The society has established 33 schools and 21 colleges. Its offerings include Engineering, Management, Pharmacy, Hotel Management, LL.B., MBA, BBA, MCA, B. Pharmacy, D. Pharmacy, BHM, M.Sc. and B.Sc. The head office is located in Model Town Jalandhar.

 Chairman - Anil Chopra
 Vice-Chairperson - Sangeeta Chopra

Institutions
 St. Soldier Law College
Paradise College of Education
St. Soldier Girls College, Nurmahal
St. Soldier Girls college, Khambra
St. Soldier Degree College, Phagwara
St. Soldier Inter College
St. Solder ETT & NTT College
St. Soldier Management & Technology Institute
St. Soldier Institute of Hotel Management & Catering Technology
St. Soldier Industrial Training Institute
St. Soldier Institute of Polytechnic & Pharmacy
St. Soldier Institute of Pharmacy

References

External links
 http://www.cmsssietm.com/groups/

Educational organisations based in India
1958 establishments in East Punjab
Organizations established in 1958